Men's discus throw events for wheelchair athletes were held at the 2004 Summer Paralympics in the Athens Olympic Stadium. Events were held in eight disability classes, F51 being held jointly with F32 cerebral palsy athletes.

F32/51

F52

The F52 event was won by Aigars Apinis, representing .

21 Sept. 2004, 18:00

F53

The F53 event was won by Alphanso Cunningham, representing .

25 Sept. 2004, 17:00

F54

The F54 event was won by Fan Liang, representing .

19 Sept. 2004, 19:00

F55

The F55 event was won by Martin Němec, representing .

26 Sept. 2004, 17:30

F56

The F56 event was won by Mohammad Sadeghimehryar, representing .

23 Sept. 2004, 09:30

F57

The F57 event was won by Rostislav Pohlmann, representing .

23 Sept. 2004, 17:30

F58

The F58 event was won by Chen Yong Gang, representing .

23 Sept. 2004, 10:30

References

M